National Mechanics (Spanish:Mecánica nacional) is a 1972 Mexican comedy film filmed in May 1971 with locations near the free highway to Cuernavaca, and directed and written by Luis Alcoriza. It was released in Mexico City on December 28, 1972.

Synopsis and TV sequel
An owner of a mechanic's shop who is a car racing enthusiast (Manolo Fábregas) goes to attend one of the races in the company of his family and friends. Among the excesses, the commotion and chaotic partying, he is cheated on by his wife (Lucha Villa), his daughter (Alma Muriel) has sex with the groom, and his mother, the grandmother of the family (Sara García), dies from stomach congestion.

A sequel was made in 1972 as a television series starring David Reynoso and Lucha Villa, and it ran for only a few episodes. It was titled Telemecánica nacional (National Telemechanics in English). The cast was completed by Nubia Martí and Jorge Ortiz de Pinedo. In the first chapter, the family came with the corpse of the grandmother. Since they had taken her sitting in the car, she was in a stiff position unable to straighten her up, so they did all manner of things to fit her body in the coffin.

Partial cast
 Manolo Fábregas as Eufemio 
 Lucha Villa as Isabel  
 Héctor Suárez as Gregorio  
 Sara García as Doña Lolita 
 Alma Muriel as Rosarito  
 Pancho Córdova as Güero Corrales  
 Aurora Clavel as Sábanas wife  
 Alejandro Ciangherotti as Lalo  
 Fabián Aranza as El Apache  
 Fernando Casanova as Rogelio
 Pilar Bayona as Blond Girl in White  
 Carlos Piñar as Blond guy in white  
 Gloria Marín as Dora  
 Maritza Olivares as Paulina  
 Fabiola Falcón as Laila  
 Eduardo López Rojas as Don Chava  
 Federico Curiel as Nando  
 Sergio Calderón as El Manchas  
 Alejandra Mora as Secretary  
 Elsa Cardiel as Secretary 
 Luis Manuel Pelayo as TV director  
 Patricio Castillo as El Sábanas  
 Paco Ignacio Taibo as Ceferino 
 Mari Carmen Taibo as Ceferino's wife
 Betty Meléndez as Woman from Asturias  
 Beatriz Fernández as Woman from Asturias 
 Miguel Zaragoza as Man from Asturias  
 Francisco Llopis as Man from Asturias  
 Margarita Villegas as Don Chava's wife  
 Yolanda Ponce as Manchas wife  
 Amira Cruzat as Nando's wife  
 Carlos León as Marcos, Rogelio's friend  
 Ramiro Orci as Iceman  
 Rodolfo Sánchez Loya as TV announcer  
 Víctor Alcocer as Gorilón

Release
The film was released in Mexico City a year and a half after it was shot. It was ranked 74th on the list of the 100 best Mexican films, according to the opinion of 25 critics and film specialists in Mexico, as published by Somos magazine in July 1994.

Release history

Awards

Ariel Awards
The Ariel Awards are awarded annually by the Mexican Academy of Film Arts and Sciences in Mexico. Mecánica Nacional received five awards out of 10 nominations.

|-
|rowspan="10" scope="row"| 15th Ariel Awards
|scope="row"| Mecánica Nacional(tied with El Castillo de la Pureza and Reed, México Insurgente)
|scope="row"| Best Picture
| 
|-
|scope="row"| Luis Alcoriza
|scope="row"| Best Direction
| 
|-
|scope="row"| Lucha Villa
|rowspan="1" scope="row"| Best Actress
| 
|-
|scope="row"| Héctor Suárez
|rowspan="1" scope="row"| Best Supporting Actor
| 
|-
|scope="row"| Gloria Marín
|rowspan="1" scope="row"| Best Supporting Actress
| 
|-
|rowspan="2" scope="row"| Luis Alcoriza
|rowspan="1" scope="row"| Best Original Screenplay
| 
|-
|scope="row"| Best Original Story
| 
|-
|scope="row"| Carlos Savage
|rowspan="1" scope="row"| Best Editing
| 
|-
|scope="row"| Manuel Fontanals
|rowspan="1" scope="row"| Best Scenography
| 
|-

References

Bibliography
 Mora, Carl J. Mexican Cinema: Reflections of a Society, 1896-2004. McFarland & Co, 2005.

External links
 
 Technical information at ITESM's Mexican cinema page (in Spanish)

1972 films
Mexican comedy films
1970s Spanish-language films
Films directed by Luis Alcoriza